Ljubomir Vorkapić (born 19 February 1967) is a Serbian former professional footballer who played as a forward.

Career
After starting out at Šparta Beli Manastir, Vorkapić joined Vojvodina in the 1986–87 season, as the club won the Yugoslav Second League and took promotion to the Yugoslav First League. He subsequently helped the team win the national championship in the 1988–89 season.

In the summer of 1991, Vorkapić was transferred to Partizan, winning the final edition of the Yugoslav Cup in his debut season. He was also a member of the team that won the First League of FR Yugoslavia in the inaugural 1992–93 season.

After moving abroad in early 1994, Vorkapić went on to play in Spain (Hércules and Almería), Portugal (Vitória Guimarães and Ovarense), Bulgaria (Slavia Sofia), and Greece (Veria).

Career statistics

Honours
Vojvodina
 Yugoslav First League: 1988–89
 Yugoslav Second League: 1986–87
Partizan
 First League of FR Yugoslavia: 1992–93
 Yugoslav Cup: 1991–92

References

External links
 
 
 
 

1967 births
Living people
Sportspeople from Osijek
Serbs of Croatia
Yugoslav footballers
Serbia and Montenegro footballers
Serbian footballers
Association football forwards
FK Vojvodina players
FK Partizan players
Hércules CF players
Vitória S.C. players
UD Almería players
A.D. Ovarense players
PFC Slavia Sofia players
Veria F.C. players
Yugoslav Second League players
Yugoslav First League players
First League of Serbia and Montenegro players
Segunda División players
Primeira Liga players
Super League Greece players
Serbia and Montenegro expatriate footballers
Expatriate footballers in Spain
Expatriate footballers in Portugal
Expatriate footballers in Bulgaria
Expatriate footballers in Greece
Serbia and Montenegro expatriate sportspeople in Spain
Serbia and Montenegro expatriate sportspeople in Bulgaria
Serbia and Montenegro expatriate sportspeople in Greece